Columnea minor is a species of epiphytic flowering plants in the family Gesneriaceae. It is found in Ecuador.

References

External links 
 

minor
Epiphytes
Flora of Ecuador